Ubiquitin-Protein Ligase E3B (UBE3B) is an enzyme encoded by UBE3B gene in humans. UBE3B has an N-terminal IQ motif, which mediates calcium-independent calmodulin binding and a large C-terminal catalytic HECT domain.

Gene discovery 
UBE3B gene was discovered in 1996 by the group of Margaret Lomax at the University of Michigan Medical School. Differential mRNA expression study, to reveal genes upregulated after acoustic trauma in the chick basilar papilla, led to identification of cDNA which exhibited 84% of identity of uncharacterized human cDNA. Interestingly, its expression dramatically increased in the regions of damaged chick inner ear upon noise-induced trauma. In 2003, human and mouse UBE3B gene was cloned and characterized by its discoverers.

Clinical significance 
Inactivating mutations in UBE3B gene have been linked to Kaufman oculocerebrofacial syndrome (KOS), a severe developmental disorder. Most mutations are loss-of-function and lead to premature stop codon. However, some mutations are of single amino acid substitution type and these occur in the low complexity region, or in the catalytic HECT domain.

Mouse models of Ube3b deficiency and UBE3B/Ube3b targets 
Deletion of murine ortholog Ube3b leads to severe developmental delay in mice. The conventional knockout of Ube3b leads to a growth retardation, decreased grip strength, and loss of vocalization associated with the metabolic disease with nucleotide metabolism and the tricarboxylic acid cycle being the most affected. Such metabolic disturbances were also found in KOS patients. In this context, UBE3B ubiquitinated α-ketoacid dehydrogenase kinase (BCKDK). Forebrain-specific conditional Ube3b knockout mice showed impaired spatial learning, altered social interactions, and repetitive behaviors. Ube3b knockout neurons exhibited decreased dendritic branching, increased density and aberrant morphology of dendritic spines, altered synaptic physiology, and changes in hippocampal circuit activity. Dendritic and spine phenotype was regulated by Ube3b in a cell-autonomous manner. Murine Ube3b ubiquitinated the catalytic γ-subunit of calcineurin, Ppp3cc, the overexpression of which phenocopied Ube3b loss with regard to dendrite branching and dendritic spine density.

References

Genes
Genetics
Enzymes